Moriah Shock Incarceration Correctional Facility Was a minimum security New York State prison, located in Mineville, Town of Moriah, Essex County, New York, in a  remote part of the Adirondack Mountains. The facility — established in former mine buildings — is home to SHOCK and intensive ASAT programs. It usually houses about 300 inmates.

External links  
  NY prison information 

Prisons in New York (state)
Buildings and structures in Essex County, New York